The Water Club is an American traditional cuisine event venue moored on a barge on the East River at East 30th Street in Murray Hill, in Manhattan, New York City. Like its sister restaurant in Fulton Ferry, The River Cafe, it was heavily damaged by Hurricane Sandy.

The venue, whose view faces Queens, serves classic American cuisine and seafood.

The restaurant is owned by Michael (Buzzy) O'Keefe and the space is leased from the New York City Economic Development Corporation, and the rent is determined by the amount of revenue. The New York City Comptroller issued a report in 2011 alleging that the Water Club was understating its revenue by failing to record some cash sales.

References

External links

Restaurants in Manhattan
Restaurants established in 1982
Murray Hill, Manhattan
1982 establishments in New York City